Mac Pro is a series of workstations and servers for professionals that are designed, developed and marketed by Apple Inc. since 2006. The Mac Pro, by some performance benchmarks, is the most powerful computer that Apple offers. It is one of four desktop computers in the current Mac lineup, sitting above the Mac Mini, iMac and Mac Studio.

Introduced in August 2006, the first-generation Mac Pro had two dual-core Xeon Woodcrest processors and a rectangular tower case carried over from the Power Mac G5. It was replaced on April 4, 2007, by a dual quad-core Xeon Clovertown model, then on January 8, 2008, by a dual quad-core Xeon Harpertown model. Revisions in 2010 and 2012 revisions had Nehalem/Westmere architecture Intel Xeon processors.

In December 2013, Apple released a new cylindrical Mac Pro (colloquially called the "trash can Mac Pro"). Apple said it offered twice the overall performance of the first generation while taking up less than one-eighth the volume. It had up to a 12-core Xeon E5 processor, dual AMD FirePro D series GPUs, PCIe-based flash storage, and an HDMI port. Thunderbolt 2 ports brought updated wired connectivity and support for six Thunderbolt Displays. Reviews initially were generally positive, with caveats. Limitations of the cylindrical design prevented Apple from upgrading the cylindrical Mac Pro with more powerful hardware.

The 2019 Mac Pro returned to a tower form factor reminiscent of the first-generation model, but with larger air cooling holes. It has up to a 28-core Xeon-W processor, eight PCIe slots, AMD Radeon Pro Vega GPUs, and replaces most data ports with USB-C and Thunderbolt 3.

Tower (2006-2012) 

Apple said that an Intel-based replacement for the 2003's PowerPC-based Power Mac G5 machines had been expected for some time before the Mac Pro was formally announced on August 7, 2006, at the annual Apple Worldwide Developers Conference (WWDC). In June 2005, Apple released the Developer Transition Kit, a prototype Intel Pentium 4–based Mac housed in a Power Mac G5 case, that was temporarily available to developers. The iMac, Mac Mini, MacBook, and MacBook Pro had moved to an Intel-based architecture starting in January 2006, leaving the Power Mac G5 as the only machine in the Mac lineup still based on the PowerPC processor architecture Apple had used since 1994. Apple had dropped the term "Power" from the other machines in their lineup and started using "Pro" on their higher-end laptop offerings. As such, the name "Mac Pro" was widely used before the machine was announced. The Mac Pro is in the Unix workstation market. Although the high-end technical market has not traditionally been an area of strength for Apple, the company has been positioning itself as a leader in non-linear digital editing for high-definition video, which demands storage and memory far in excess of a general desktop machine. Additionally, the codecs used in these applications are generally processor intensive and highly threadable, which Apple's ProRes white paper describes as scaling almost linearly with additional processor cores. Apple's previous machine aimed at this market, the Power Mac G5, has up to two dual-core processors (marketed as "Quad-Core"), but lacks the storage expansion capabilities of the newer design.

Original marketing materials for the Mac Pro generally referred to the middle-of-the-line model with 2 × dual-core 2.66 GHz processors. Previously, Apple featured the base model with the words "starting at" or "from" when describing the pricing, but the online US Apple Store listed the "Mac Pro at $2499", the price for the mid-range model. The system could be configured at US$2299, much more comparable with the former base-model dual-core G5 at US$1999, although offering considerably more processing power. Post revision, the default configurations for the Mac Pro includes one quad-core Xeon 3500 at 2.66 GHz or two quad-core Xeon 5500s at 2.26 GHz each. Like its predecessor, the Power Mac G5, the pre-2013 Mac Pro was Apple's only desktop with standard expansion slots for graphics adapters and other expansion cards.

Apple received criticism after an incremental upgrade to the Mac Pro line following the 2012 WWDC conference. The line received more default memory and increased processor speed but still used Intel's older Westmere-EP processors instead of the newer E5 series. The line also lacked then-current technologies like SATA III, USB 3, and Thunderbolt, the last of which had been added to every other Macintosh at that point. An email from Apple CEO Tim Cook promised a more significant update to the line in 2013.

Apple stopped shipping the first-generation Mac Pro in Europe on March 1, 2013 after an amendment to a safety regulation left the professional Mac non-compliant. The last day to order was February 18, 2013. The first-generation Mac Pro was removed from Apple's online store following the unveiling of the redesigned cylindrical Mac Pro at a media event on October 22, 2013.

CPU 
All Mac Pro systems were available with one or two central processing units (CPU) with options giving 2, 4, 6, 8, or 12 cores. As an example, the 8-core standard configuration Mac Pro 2010 uses two 4-core Intel E5620 Xeon CPUs at 2.4 GHz, but could be configured with two 6-core Intel Xeon X5670 CPUs at 2.93 GHz. The 2006–2008 models use the LGA 771 socket, while the Early 2009 and later use the LGA 1366 socket, meaning either can be removed and replaced with compatible 64-bit Intel Xeon CPUs. A 64-bit EFI firmware was not introduced until the MacPro3,1, earlier models can only operate as 32-bit despite having 64-bit Xeon processors, however this only applies to the EFI side of the System, as the Mac boots everything else in BIOS Compatibility mode, and operating systems can take advantage of full 64 bit support. The newer LGA 1366 sockets utilize Intel's QuickPath Interconnect (QPI) integrated into the CPU in lieu of an independent system bus; this means the "bus" frequency is relative to the CPU chipset, and upgrading a CPU is not bottlenecked by the computer's existing architecture.

Memory 
The original Mac Pro's main memory uses 667 MHz DDR2 ECC FB-DIMMs; the early 2008 model uses 800 MHz ECC DDR2 FB-DIMMS, the 2009 and onward Mac Pro use 1066 MHz DDR3 ECC DIMMs for the standard models, and 1333 MHz DDR3 ECC DIMMs for systems configured with 2.66 GHz or faster CPUs. In the original and 2008 models, these modules are installed in pairs, one each on two riser cards. The cards have 4 DIMM slots each, allowing a total of 32 GB (1 GB = 10243 B) of memory (8 × 4 GB) to be installed. Notably, due to its FB-DIMM architecture, installing more RAM in the Mac Pro will improve its memory bandwidth, but may also increase its memory latency. With a simple installation of a single FB-DIMM, the peak bandwidth is 8000 MB/s (1 MB = 10002 B), but this can increase to 16000 MB/s by installing two FB-DIMMs, one on each of the two buses, which is the default configuration from Apple. While electrically the FB-DIMMs are standard, for pre-2009 Mac Pro models Apple specifies larger-than-normal heatsinks on the memory modules. Problems have been reported by users who have used third party RAM with normal size FB-DIMM heatsinks. (see notes below). 2009 and later Mac Pro computers do not require memory modules with heatsinks.

Hard drives 

The Mac Pro had room for four internal 3.5" SATA-300 hard drives in four internal "bays". The hard drives were mounted on individual trays (also known as "sleds") by captive screws. A set of four drive trays was supplied with each machine. Adding hard drives to the system did not require cables to be attached as the drive was connected to the system simply by being inserted into the corresponding drive slot. A case lock on the back of the system locked the disks trays into their positions.
The Mac Pro also supported Serial ATA solid-state drives (SSD) in the 4 hard drive bays via an SSD-to-hard drive sled adapter (mid-2010 models and later), and by third-party solutions for earlier models (e.g., by an adapter/bracket which plugged into an unused PCIe slot). Various 2.5-inch SSD drive capacities and configurations were available as options.
The Mac Pro was also available with an optional hardware RAID card. With the addition of a SAS controller card or SAS RAID controller card, SAS drives could be directly connected to the system's SATA ports.
Two optical drive bays were provided, each with a corresponding SATA port and an Ultra ATA/100 port.
The Mac Pro had one PATA port and could support two PATA devices in the optical drive bays. It had a total of six SATA ports – four were connected to the system's drive bays, and two were not connected. The extra SATA ports could be put into service through the use of after-market extender cables to connect internal optical drives, or to provide eSATA ports with the use of an eSATA bulkhead connector. However, the two extra SATA ports were unsupported and disabled under Boot Camp.

Expansion cards 

The 2008 model had two PCI Express (PCIe) 2.0 expansion slots and two PCI Express 1.1 slots, providing them with up to 300 W of power in total. The first slot was double wide and intended to hold the main video card, arranged with an empty area the width of a normal card beside it to leave room for the large coolers modern cards often use. In most machines, one slot would be blocked by the cooler. Instead of the tiny screws typically used to fasten the cards to the case, in the Mac Pro a single "bar" held the cards in place, which is itself held in place by two "captive" thumbscrews that can be loosened by hand without tools and will not fall out of the case.

On the original Mac Pro introduced in August 2006, the PCIe slots can be configured individually to give more bandwidth to devices that require it, with a total of 40 "lanes", or 13 GB/s total throughput. When running Mac OS X, the Mac Pro did not support SLI or ATI CrossFire, limiting its ability to use the latest "high-end gaming" video card products; however, individuals have reported success with both CrossFire and SLI installations when running Windows XP, as SLI and CrossFire compatibility is largely a function of software.

The bandwidth allocation of the PCIe slots can be configured via the Expansion Slot Utility included with Mac OS X only on the August 2006 Mac Pro. The Early-2008 and later Mac Pros had PCIe slots hardwired as in the accompanying table.

External connectivity 

For external connectivity, the Mac Pro included five USB 2.0 ports, two FireWire 400 and two FireWire 800 (Late 2006 until Early 2008), respectively four FireWire 800 (Early 2009 until Mid 2012) ports. Networking was supported with two built-in Gigabit Ethernet ports. 802.11 a/b/g/n Wi-Fi support (AirPort Extreme) required an optional module in the Mid 2006, Early 2008 and Early 2009 models, whereas in the 2010 model and later Wi-Fi was standard. Bluetooth also required an optional module in the Mid 2006 model, but was standard in the Early 2008 and newer models. Displays were supported by one or (optionally) more PCIe graphics cards. More recent cards featured two Mini DisplayPort connectors and one dual-link Digital Visual Interface (DVI) port, with various configurations of on-card graphics memory available.
Digital (TOSlink optical) audio and analog 3.5 mm stereo mini jacks for sound in and out were included, the latter becoming available on both the front and back of the case.
Unlike other Mac computers, the Mac Pro did not include an infrared receiver (required to use the Apple Remote). In Mac OS X Leopard, Front Row could be accessed on the Mac Pro (and other Macs) using the Command (⌘)-Escape keystroke.

Case 

From 2006 through 2012, the exterior of the Mac Pro's aluminum case was very similar to that of the Power Mac G5, with the exception of an additional optical drive bay, a new arrangement of I/O ports on both the front and the back, and one less exhaust vent on the back.

The case could be opened by operating a single lever on the back, which unlocked one of the two sides of the machine, as well as the drive bays. All of the expansion slots for memory, PCIe cards and drives could be accessed with the side panel removed and no tools were required for installation.
The Mac Pro's Xeon processors generated much less heat than the previous 2-core G5s, so the size of the internal cooling devices were reduced significantly.

This allowed the interior to be re-arranged, leaving more room at the top of the case and doubling the number of internal drive bays. This also allowed the elimination of the large clear plastic air deflector used as part of the cooling system in the Power Mac G5. Less heat also meant less air to move out of the case for cooling during normal operations; the Mac Pro was very quiet in normal operation, quieter than the much noisier Power Mac G5, and proved difficult to measure using common sound pressure level meters. The front of the case, which has small perforated holes across its entire surface area, has caused Macintosh enthusiasts to refer to the first generation as the "cheese grater" Mac Pro.

Operating systems 
The Mac Pro comes with EFI 1.1, a successor to Apple's use of Open Firmware and the wider industry's use of BIOS.

Apple's Boot Camp provides BIOS backwards compatibility, allowing dual and triple boot configurations. These operating systems are installable on Intel x86–based Apple computers:

Mac OS X 10.4.7 and later
Microsoft Windows XP, Vista, and Windows 7 32-bit & 64-bit (hardware drivers are included in Boot Camp)
Other x86 operating systems such as Linux x86, Solaris, and BSD

This is made possible by the presence of an x86 Intel architecture as provided by the CPU and the BIOS emulation which Apple has provided on top of EFI. Installing any additional operating system other than Windows is not supported directly by Apple. Though Apple's Boot Camp drivers are only for Windows, it is often possible to achieve full or nearly full compatibility with another OS by using third-party drivers.

Specifications 
All are "obsolete."

Reception 
Ars Technica reviewed the 2006 Mac Pro, calling it a solid "multiplatform device" and rating it 9 out of 10. CNET praised the design and value, although did not think it provided the flexibility of other systems. They gave it an 8 out of 10.

Sound on Sound, an audio recording technology magazine, thought it was a "great machine" for musicians and audio engineers. Architosh, an online architectural design magazine focused on mac technology, would have scored it a perfect five except for a few issues with software compatibility and the high price for FB-DIMM memory.

Cylinder (2013) 

Apple Senior Vice President of Marketing Phil Schiller presented a "sneak peek" of the completely redesigned Mac Pro during the 2013 Worldwide Developers Conference keynote. The video revealed an overhauled case design, a polished reflective aluminum cylinder built around a central thermal dissipation core and vented by a single fan, which pulls air from under the case, through the core, and out the top of the case. The only finish available is black, though a single red-finished unit was produced with Product Red. Apple states that the cylindrical Mac Pro achieves twice the performance of the last model. The model was assembled in Austin, Texas, by Apple's supplier Flextronics on a highly automated line. The announcement six months prior to release was unusual for Apple, which typically announces products when they are ready for market. It was released on December 19, 2013.

The cylindrical thermal core was unable to adapt to changing hardware trends and left the Mac Pro without updates for over three years, leading Apple to make a rare admission of a product's failure in April 2017 when it detailed the issues surrounding the design and promised a totally redesigned Mac Pro. The design of the cylindrical Mac Pro has received mixed reviews, which has been described as appearing like a "small black trash can", rice cooker, or R2-D2 or Darth Vader's helmet. On September 18, 2018, the Mac Pro surpassed the Macintosh Plus's production life record for an unchanged Mac model, with the Plus having remained on sale unchanged for 1,734 days. It was discontinued on December 10, 2019, after being on sale unchanged for a record 2,182 days.

Hardware 
It supports one central processing unit (CPU) (up to a 12-core Xeon E5 CPU), four 1866 MHz DDR3 slots, dual AMD FirePro D series GPUs (up to D700 with 6 GB VRAM each), and PCIe-based flash storage. There is a 3× MIMO antenna system for the unit's 802.11ac WiFi networking interface, Bluetooth 4.0 to facilitate close-range wireless functions such as music transfer, keyboards, mice, tablets, speakers, security, cameras, and printers. The system can simultaneously support six Apple Thunderbolt Displays, or three 4K resolution computer monitors.

The cylindrical Mac Pro has a redesigned configuration of ports. It has a HDMI 1.4 port, dual Gigabit Ethernet ports, six Thunderbolt 2 ports, four USB 3 ports, and combined digital Mini-TOSlink optical / analog 3.5 mm stereo mini jack for audio output. It also has a headphones mini jack (the two are distinctly selectable within the Sound System Preference panel, Output tab). There is no dedicated port for inputting audio. The system has a low-fidelity internal mono speaker. The Thunderbolt 2 ports support up to thirty-six Thunderbolt devices (six per port) and can concurrently support up to three 4K displays. This design requires two GPUs to support the seven display outputs (HDMI and six Thunderbolt). The I/O panel illuminates itself when the unit senses it has been moved to make it easier for the user to see the ports. Unlike the previous model, it has no FireWire 800 ports, dedicated digital audio in/out ports, a SuperDrive, DVI port, 3.5-inch drive bays for replaceable storage drives, or changeable internal PCIe slots. Instead, there are six Thunderbolt 2 ports to connect high-speed external peripherals, including enclosures for internal PCIe cards.

Apple's website mentions only RAM and flash storage as user-serviceable, though third party tear-downs show nearly all components can be removed and replaced. However, special tools only available from Apple are necessary for proper dismantling and reassembly. Apple has also specified mandatory and recommended tightening torque values for nearly every screw, with the most important being those securing the GPUs and CPU riser card to the thermal core. According to Apple, not tightening screws to the mandatory torque values may result in damage or malfunction. A lock switch on the aluminum housing allows for easy access to the internals, as well as fitting a security lock with its own cable, and components are secured with Torx screws. The flash storage and GPUs use proprietary connectors and are specially sized to fit into the enclosure. The CPU is not soldered to the riser card and can be replaced with another LGA 2011 socket processor, including processor options not offered by Apple. The type of RAM modules that Apple supplies with the late-2013 Mac Pro in the default configuration are ECC  (UDIMM) on the up to 8 GB modules (shown on each module as PC3-14900E). Apple offers as an optional upgrade 16 GB modules are ECC  (RDIMM) modules (shown on each module as PC3-14900R). The higher-capacity 32 GB modules that some third-party vendors offer are also RDIMM. The UDIMM and RDIMM module types cannot be mixed. Apple publishes recommended configurations to use.

Operating systems 
Apple's Boot Camp provides BIOS backwards compatibility, allowing dual and triple boot configurations. These operating systems are installable on Intel x64-based Apple computers:

OS X Mavericks and later
Windows 7, 8.1 and 10 64-bit (hardware drivers are included in Boot Camp)
Linux via Linux installers (Boot Camp does not provide Linux support in the same way it does with Windows)

Specifications

Reception 
Reception of the new design was mixed, initially receiving positive reviews, but more negative in the long term, due to Apple's failure to upgrade the hardware specs. The performance had been widely lauded, especially handling video tasks on the dual GPU units, with some reviewers noting the ability to apply dozens of filters to realtime 4K resolution video in Final Cut Pro X. Drive performance, connected via PCIe, was also widely mentioned as a strong point. Technical reviewers praised the OpenCL API under which the machine's powerful twin GPUs and its multi-core CPU can be treated as a single pool of computing power. However, in late 2013 through early 2014, some reviewers had noted the lack of internal expandability, second CPU, serviceability, and questioned the then-limited offerings via Thunderbolt 2 ports. By 2016, reviewers started to agree that the Mac Pro was now lacking in functionality and power, it having not been updated since 2013, and it was past time for Apple to update it. Apple later revealed in 2017 that the thermal core design had limited the ability to upgrade the Mac Pro's GPUs and that a new design was under development, to be released sometime after 2017.

Problems 
On February 5, 2016, Apple identified problems with FirePro D500 and D700 GPUs manufactured between February 8, 2015 and April 11, 2015. Issues included "distorted video, no video, system instability, freezing, restarts, shut downs, or may prevent system start up." Customers who owned a Mac Pro exhibiting those issues could take their affected machine to Apple or an authorized service provider to have both GPUs replaced for free. The repair program ended on May 30, 2018. Customers who owned Mac Pros with FirePro D300 GPUs also complained about problems, but those GPUs were not included in the repair program until July 2018. Customers with FirePro GPUs not manufactured between those dates have complained of issues including overheating and thermal throttling. It is believed Apple has not enabled a satisfactory cooling fan profile in order to properly reduce heat from the system. Users have had to resort to using third-party apps to manually increase the fan speed to prevent the GPUs from overheating.

Lattice tower or rack (2019) 

In April 2018, Apple confirmed that a redesigned Mac Pro would be released in 2019 to replace the 2013 model. Apple announced this new Mac Pro on June 3, 2019 at the World Wide Developers Conference. It returns to a tower design similar to the Power Mac G5 in 2003 and the first-generation model in 2006. The design also includes a new thermal architecture with three impeller fans, which promises to prevent the computer from having to throttle the processor so that it can always run at its peak performance level. The RAM is expandable to 1.5 TB using twelve 128 GB DIMMs. It can be configured with up to two AMD Radeon Pro GPUs, based on RDNA 1 architecture, which come in a custom MPX module, which are fanless and use the chassis's cooling system. Apple's Afterburner card is a custom add-on, which adds hardware acceleration for ProRes codecs. Similar to the second generation, the cover can be removed to access the internals, which features eight PCIe slots for expansion, making this the first Mac with six or more expansion slots since the Power Macintosh 9600 in 1997. It can also be purchased with wheels and in a rack mount configuration. Feet and wheels are not stated by Apple to be user-replaceable and require sending the machine to an Apple Store or authorized service provider, though tear-downs show the feet are simply screwed on. It was announced alongside the Pro Display XDR, a 6K display with the same finish and lattice pattern.

The 2019 Mac Pro is capable of Lights Out Management. It is also the first Macintosh computer to feature 10 Gigabit Ethernet ports equipped as standard in all configurations.

After initial reports that the Mac Pro would be assembled in China, Apple confirmed in September 2019 it would be assembled in Austin, Texas, at the same facility as the previous-generation Mac Pro, making it the sole Apple product assembled in the United States. The production was the subject of a tariff dispute with US President Donald Trump in late 2019. Trump toured the Mac Pro assembly line in November 2019. 

Radeon Pro W5700X and W5500X graphics cards were added as options in April and July 2020, respectively. In August 2021, options for RDNA 2–based Radeon Pro cards (W6800X, W6800X Duo and W6900X) were added. In March 2022, Apple upgraded the base model configuration with the Radeon Pro W5500X and 512 GB SSD, replacing the Radeon Pro 580X graphics and 256 GB SSD previously offered.

Design 

The 2019 Mac Pro returns to a tower form factor and features a prominent lattice pattern on its front and rear. The lattice design was purportedly originally developed by Jony Ive for the Power Mac G4 Cube in 2000. It comes bundled with a new Magic Keyboard with black keys in a silver chassis, and a black Magic Mouse 2 or Magic Trackpad 2 with a silver underside.

Reception 
Initial reviews were generally positive. The only pre-release review models of the Mac Pro and Pro Display XDR were provided to YouTube tech vloggers Justine Ezarik, Marques Brownlee, and Jonathan Morrison, rather than reviewers from traditional news outlets.

iFixit gave it a repairability score of 9/10, noting that every part of the machine is user-replaceable. The SSD can also be replaced via Apple official parts, but require an Apple Configurator restore to re-pair it with the T2 chip.

Specifications

Future Apple silicon model 
At an Apple media event on March 8, 2022, senior vice president of hardware engineering John Ternus stated that an Apple silicon Mac Pro is being developed that will complete the line-up of Apple silicon Macs.

Supported operating systems

Mac Pro Server 
On November 5, 2010, Apple introduced the Mac Pro Server, which officially replaced the Xserve line of Apple servers as of January 31, 2011. The Mac Pro Server includes an unlimited Mac OS X Server license and an Intel Xeon 2.8 GHz quad-core processor, with 8 GB of DDR3 RAM. In mid-2012, the Mac Pro Server was upgraded to an Intel Xeon 3.2 GHz quad-core processor. The Mac Pro Server was discontinued on October 22, 2013, with the introduction of the cylindrical Mac Pro. However, the OS X Server software package can be purchased from the Mac App Store. The redesigned Mac Pro released on December 10, 2019 has a rack-mount version, available in the same configurations as the standard Mac Pro for a $500 premium. The Mac Pro Rack comes with mounting rails to mount it in a server rack, and fits in a 5 Rack Unit (or "U") space.

See also 
 Dell Precision
 Fujitsu Celsius
 HP Z
 Lenovo ThinkStation

Explanatory notes

References

External links 

  – official site

Computer workstations
Computer-related introductions in 2006
Macintosh computers by product line
Macintosh towers
X86 Macintosh computers